A rattle is a percussion beater that is attached to or enclosed by a percussion instrument so that motion of the instrument will cause the rattle to strike the instrument and create musical sound.

Examples include:

 The rivets of a sizzle cymbal.
 The jingles of a tambourine.
 The seeds inside a maraca.
 The ball chain of a cabasa.
 The snares of a snare drum.

Rattles may be the primary cause of the instrument's sound, as in the maraca, or they may modify its sound, as in the sizzle cymbal, or they may be used for both purposes depending on how it is played, as in the tambourine.

See also

 Rattle (percussion instrument)
 Rattle (disambiguation)

Musical instrument parts and accessories
Percussion instrument beaters